German submarine U-863 was a long-range Type IXD2 U-boat built for Nazi Germany's Kriegsmarine during World War II.

She was ordered on 5 June 1941, and was laid down on 15 September 1942 at DeSchiMAG AG Weser, Bremen, as yard number 1069. She was launched on 29 June 1943 and commissioned under the command of Kapitänleutnant Dietrich von der Esch on 3 November 1943.

Design
German Type IXD2 submarines were considerably larger than the original Type IXs. U-863 had a displacement of  when at the surface and  while submerged. She had two shafts and two  propellers.

U-863 was fitted with six  torpedo tubes (four fitted at the bow and two at the stern), 24 torpedoes, one  SK C/32 naval gun, 150 rounds, and a  Flak M42 with 2575 rounds as well as two  C/30 anti-aircraft guns with 8100 rounds. The boat had a complement of fifty-five.

Service history
On 20 July 1944, U-863 was attacked with 6pdr (57mm) cannon fire and depth charges from a TseTse flown by Norwegian pilot Rolf Leithe, flying for RAF 333 Squadron. U-863 was forced back to base to repair the minor damage suffered in the attack.

On 29 September; U-863 was sunk by depth charges east southeast of Recife, by two US Navy PB4Y-1 Liberator bomber from VB-107. All 69 of her crew were lost.

References

Bibliography

External links

External links

World War II submarines of Germany
German Type IX submarines
Ships built in Bremen (state)
1943 ships
U-boats commissioned in 1943
U-boats sunk in 1944
World War II shipwrecks in the Atlantic Ocean
Maritime incidents in September 1944
Ships lost with all hands